The Petrolia Flyers are a Canadian junior ice hockey team based in Petrolia, Ontario.  They play in the Provincial Junior Hockey League of the Ontario Hockey Association and Hockey Canada.  From 1988 until 2016, the team was known as the Alvinston Flyers, which played in the Great Lakes Jr C Hockey League.

History

The Flyers were founded in 1988 as members of the Western Junior D Hockey League.  The Flyers only managed two wins during the 1988-89 season and six in the 1989-90 season.  In 1992-93, the Flyers finally showed some promise in the (then) OHA Junior Development League with a record of 22-15-1-0.  Unfortunately for the Flyers, the OHAJDL had swelled up to 18 teams by then and despite a good record, with so many teams, the Flyers only managed to place sixth.  After six seasons with the WJDHL/OHAJDL, the Flyers were promoted to the Great Lakes Junior C Hockey League.

From the year the Flyers joined, 1994-95, until the 2012-13 season, the Flyers finished as high as second place in the league standings (2003-04, 25-13-1-1), but were not able to have any real success in the league playoffs.  From the 2007 playoffs until the 2013 playoffs, the Flyers were eliminated in the quarter-finals 6 times and did not qualify in 2009.

In February 2016, Flyers management submitted a proposal to relocate the team to Petrolia starting the next season.  The proposal was accepted and the team moved to Petrolia.  During the summer of 2016 the Great Lakes Junior C Hockey League was amalgamated into the Provincial Junior Hockey League.

Season-by-season record

2019-2020 Team Staff
President - Dennis Meston
General Manager - Dennis Meston
Assistant manager - Dave McKinley
Head coach - Dale Timmermans
Assistant coach - Brian Shannon
Assistant coach - Erin White
Assistant coach - Mike Annett
Trainer - Bob Bressette
Assistant Trainer - LeeAnn Ellis
Equipment Manager - Owen Bray
Assistant Equipment Manager - Willy Bright

External links
Flyers Webpage

Great Lakes Junior C Hockey League teams
1988 establishments in Ontario
Ice hockey clubs established in 1988